Henri Cochet defeated René Lacoste 5–7, 6–3, 6–1, 6–3 in the final to win the men's singles tennis title at the 1928 French Championships.

Seeds
The seeded players are listed below. Henri Cochet is the champion; others show the round in which they were eliminated.

  René Lacoste (finalist)
  Frank Hunter (fourth round)
  Edouard Borotra (third round)
  Mohammed Sleem (fourth round)
  J. Colin Gregory (third round)
  Hendrik Timmer (second round)
  Ronaldo Boyd (quarterfinals)
  Jack Crawford (quarterfinals)
  Nigel Sharpe (third round)
  Norman Brookes (second round)
  Gerald Patterson (fourth round)
  Guillermo Robson (fourth round)
  Jacques Brugnon (quarterfinals)
  Harry Hopman (second round)
  Henri Cochet (champion)
  Franz Matejka (fourth round)

Draw

Key
 Q = Qualifier
 WC = Wild card
 LL = Lucky loser
 r = Retired

Finals

Earlier rounds

Section 1

Section 2

Section 3

Section 4

Section 5

Section 6

Section 7

Section 8

References

External links
 

French Championships - Men's Singles
French Championships (tennis) by year – Men's singles